William John Kenny (January 12, 1853 – October 24, 1913) was an American prelate of the Roman Catholic Church. He served as bishop of the Diocese of St. Augustine in Florida from 1902 until his death in 1913.

Biography

Early life 
William Kenny was born on January 12, 1853, in Delhi, New York, to John and Ann (née McDonough) Kenny. As a youth, he worked in Scranton, Pennsylvania, in newspaper jobs.  After saving enough money for his seminary education, he entered St. Bonaventure University near Olean, New York.

Priesthood 
On January 15, 1879, Kenny was ordained to the priesthood for the Diocese of St. Augustine by Bishop John Moore. After a short residence in Jacksonville, Florida, he was put in charge of the mission in Palatka, Florida, remaining there for three years. In June 1884, Kenny was named pastor of the Immaculate Conception Parish in Jacksonville, Florida. During his tenure as pastor, he became active in civic organizations and community service associations. Kenny led relief efforts during yellow fever outbreaks and the Jacksonville Great Fire of 1901. He was named vicar general of the diocese in 1889.

Bishop of St. Augustine 
On March 25, 1902, Kenny was appointed the third bishop of the Diocese of St. Augustine by Pope Leo XIII. He was the diocese's first American-born bishop. He received his episcopal consecration on May 18, 1902, from Cardinal James Gibbons, with Bishops Benjamin Keiley and Leo Michael Haid serving as co-consecrators, in the Cathedral of St. Augustine. 

During his tenure as bishop, Kenny increased the recruitment of Irish priests and nuns, reorganized diocesan offices, expanded missionary efforts to Florida's interior and smaller towns, and more than doubled diocesan fundraising. He also established the first Catholic parish for African Americans in the state.

While traveling to the American Missionary Congress in Boston, Massachusetts, in October 1913, Kenny stopped in Baltimore to visit St. Mary's Seminary. After falling ill at the seminary, he was hospitalized. William Kenny died on October 24, 1913 in Baltimore at age 60.Bishop Kenny High School in Jacksonville is named for him.

References

Episcopal succession

1853 births
1913 deaths
People from Delhi, New York
Roman Catholic bishops of Saint Augustine
20th-century Roman Catholic bishops in the United States
St. Bonaventure University alumni
People from Jacksonville, Florida
Catholics from New York (state)